The following is the list of squads that took part in the men's water polo tournament at the 1956 Summer Olympics.

CF=Centre Forward
CB=Centre Back
D=Defender
GK=Goalkeeper

Australia
Australia entered a squad of nine players.

Head coach:

Great Britain
Great Britain entered an unknown number of players. They scored 25 goals but all scorers are unknown.

Head coach:

Hungary
Hungary entered a squad of eleven players. They scored 26 goals but only twenty scorers are known.

Head coach: Béla Rajki

Italy
Italy entered a squad of eleven players. They scored 17 goals but all scorers are unknown.

Head coach: Mario Majoni

Romania
Romania entered a squad of nine players. They scored 26 goals but all scorers are unknown.

Head coach: Balint Adalbert

Singapore
The following players represented Singapore.

 David Lim
 Thio Gim Hock
 Lionel Chee
 Eric Yeo
 Gan Eng Teck
 Wiebe Wolters
 Tan Eng Bock
 Skip Wolters
 Oh Chwee Hock
 Lim Teck Pan

Soviet Union
The Soviet Union entered a squad of eleven players. They scored 21 goals.

Head coach:

United States
The United States entered a squad of eleven players. They scored 15 goals but only three scorers are known.

Head coach: Neill Kohlhase (coach), Sam Greller (manager)

United Team of Germany
Germany entered a squad of eleven players. They scored 16 goals but all scorers are unknown.

Head coach:

Yugoslavia
Yugoslavia entered a squad of eleven players. They scored 25 goals but all scorers are unknown.

Head coach: File Bonačić

References

External links
 Olympic Report
 

1956 Summer Olympics